Frederick Henry McDowall  (1 September 1900 – 27 December 1974) was a New Zealand dairy scientist and administrator. He was born in Waianiwa, Southland, New Zealand on 1 September 1900.

In the 1960 New Year Honours, McDowall was appointed an Officer of the Order of the British Empire.

His son Bob McDowall became an ichthyologist.

References

1900 births
1974 deaths
New Zealand scientists
New Zealand Officers of the Order of the British Empire
People from Southland, New Zealand